This is a list of electoral division results for the 2022 Australian federal election in the state of South Australia.

This election was held using instant-runoff voting. In South Australia in this election, there was one "turn-over". In Boothby, a Labor candidate who did not lead in the first count took the seat in the end.

Overall results

Results by division

Adelaide

Barker

Boothby

Grey

Hindmarsh

Kingston

Makin

Mayo

Spence

Sturt

References

South Australia 2022
2022 Australian federal election